Julio César Grauert (1902–1933) was a Uruguayan journalist and political figure.

Background
He was a lawyer by profession. His brother Héctor Grauert (1907–1991) was active in politics.

Public office
A member of the Uruguayan Colorado Party, he was elected a Deputy in 1929.

Death
He died in a confrontation with the security forces in 1933, during the Presidency of Gabriel Terra.

See also
Politics of Uruguay
List of political families#Uruguay

References

People from Montevideo
Uruguayan people of German descent
1902 births
1933 deaths
Uruguayan journalists
Colorado Party (Uruguay) politicians
Members of the Chamber of Representatives of Uruguay
20th-century journalists